Gerald Clarke (born June 21, 1937) is an American writer, best known for the biographies Capote (1988) (made into the Oscar-winning 2005 film Capote) and Get Happy: The Life of Judy Garland (2000).

He has also written for magazines including Esquire, Architectural Digest, and Time, where he was a senior writer for many years.

While an undergraduate at Yale, he wrote for campus humor magazine The Yale Record.

A native of Los Angeles, Clarke now lives in Bridgehampton, in eastern Long Island, New York.

References

External links 

 
 
 Gerald Clarke at Library of Congress Authorities — with six catalog records

1937 births
Living people
People from Greater Los Angeles
Yale University alumni
American biographers
American male biographers
People from Bridgehampton, New York
Historians from New York (state)